The Finland women's national handball team is the national team of Finland. It takes part in international team handball competitions.

The team has yet to participate in a European or World championship.

References

External links
Official website
IHF profile

National team
Handball
Women's national handball teams